Narayanpet is a town, & district headquarters of Narayanpet district of the Indian state of Telangana. It is located 165 km from the state capital Hyderabad and  62 km from Mahabubnagar.

History 

Naraynpet was a major economic town in the region during the 1900s. Business flourished during the Lokapally establishment. Major goods traded in Narayanpet were food grains, silk and cotton sarees, gold and silver ornaments, red bricks, black wool and other articles. Narayanpet was also a Suba (greater administrative district) in Nizam period. Narayanpet also got its municipality first in the former Mahaboobnagar district. Despite being a major commercial town, development in Narayanpet was largely delayed due to administrative faults, political negligence and lack of interest from the leaders. Narayanpet trademark cotton and silk sarees, and famous line of jewellery shops sell high purity gold and silver ornaments.

Villages in the Narayanpet Mandal 

 Narayanpet
 Bhairamkonda
 Perapalla
 Eklaspur
 Kothapalle
 Singar
 Jajapur
 Jalalpur
 Appakapalle
 Seranpalle
 Chinnajatram
 Ammireddipalle
 Appireddipalle
 Boinpalle
 Anthwar
 Ayyawaripalle
 Kollampalle
 Kotakonda
 Narasappapalle
 Abhangapur
 Lingampalle (Kollampalle)
 Thirumalapur
 Bommanpad
 Gurlapally
 Kondareddypally
 Kourampally

Demographics 

 census, Narayanpet had a population of 41,752. The total population constitute, 20,697 males and 21,055 females—a sex ratio of 1017 females per 1000 males. 4,997 children are in the age group of 0–6 years, of which 2,642 are boys and 2,355 are girls. The average literacy rate stands at 72.18% with 26,531 literates, significantly higher than the state average of 55.04%.

Governance 

Narayanpet Municipality was constituted in 1937 and is classified as a 2nd grade municipality with 24 election wards.

Transport 

The nearest railway station is Saidapur Railway Station (Formerly Narayanpet RD).TSRTC bus depo in the town connects Narayanpet well to all major towns and cities around.

References 

Narayanpet district